Odong, also called pancit odong, is a Visayan noodle soup made with  noodles, canned smoked sardines (tinapa) in tomato sauce, bottle gourd, loofah, chayote, ginger, garlic, red onions, and various other vegetables. It is garnished and spiced with black pepper, scallions, toasted garlic, calamansi, or labuyo chilis. The dish is usually prepared as a soup, but it can also be cooked with minimal water, in which case, it is known as odong guisado. 

It is a common simple and cheap meal in Mindanao (particularly the Davao Region) and the Visayas Islands. It is almost always eaten with white rice, rarely on its own.

It is named after the round flour noodles called  which are closest in texture and taste to the Okinawa soba. The name is derived from the Japanese udon noodles, although it does not use udon noodles or bear any resemblance to udon dishes. It originates from the Davao Region of Mindanao which had a large Japanese migrant community in the early 1900s. The  noodles were previously locally manufactured by Okinawans, but modern  noodles (which are distinctly yellowish) are imported from China. Because  noodles are difficult to find in other regions, they can be substituted with other types of noodles; including misua, miki (egg noodles), udon, and even instant noodles.

See also
 Pancit Molo
 La Paz Batchoy
 Ginataan
 List of soups

References

External links

Japanese cuisine
Japanese fusion cuisine
Philippine soups
Pancit
Noodle soups
Visayan cuisine